Orton/Smith Field Airport  was located  south of Orton, Ontario Canada.

References

Defunct airports in Ontario